Jan Rytkjær Callesen (born 2 May 1963 in Sønderborg) is a Danish politician, who was a member of the Folketing for the Danish People's Party from 2015 to 2019.

Political career
Calleen has been a member of Sønderborg Municipality's municipal council since 2010. He was elected into parliament at the 2015 Danish general election, where he received 2,972 votes. In the 2019 election he received 1,056 votes and did not get reelected.

References

External links 
 Biography on the website of the Danish Parliament (Folketinget)

Living people
1963 births
People from Sønderborg Municipality
Danish People's Party politicians
Danish municipal councillors
Members of the Folketing 2015–2019